was a Japanese geisha and singer who also performed in a few films before World War II. Her most famous film was The Million Ryo Pot, which records not only her remarkable natural acting skill, but numerous songs she sang accompanied by a shamisen.

Life

Born with the name Yoshiko, the first daughter of nine children to her father Masayoshi and mother Chika, in the area of which is now known as Nishinoomote, Kagoshima. Her family ran a grocery. When an okiya was established in town, Yoshiko began training there under the name "Yaemaru." While in Kagoshima, she grew in popularity, and performed many times for NHK radio. She also recorded some of her songs with Columbia Records.

In 1930, she met and married the songwriter Shinpei Nakayama. They met at the ryotei where Kiyozō performed, and initially impressed by her talent, Nakayama decided to write for her unique and lovely voice. Eventually, while working, the two developed a mutual attraction. They ended up married in 1937.

In the same year, the couple moved to Tokyo. The next year, Kiyozō changed her name to Shinbashi Kiyozō (as geisha often took the place name of their area as a stage surname). She debuted her first record in Tokyo, "Washiya Shiranu" in 1933.

In 1935, the increasingly popular artist performed as the lead actress in Yamanaka Sadao's film, The Million Ryo Pot.

Kiyozō recorded a number of records for Columbia under the name "Kiyomaru," as well.

In 1956, Kiyozō toured America, in San Francisco, New York, Washington and Chicago, to play the shamisen at various events promoting Kagoshima and Japanese culture. When she returned, she spent the rest of her days in Atami. She died from cancer in 1963, and is interred in Tama Cemetery.

Songs
Some of the songs she recorded are:

 Minyo style
 Kagoshima Ohara-bushi
 Kagoshima San-sagari
 Kagoshima Hanya-bushi
 Kagoshima Yosakoi-bushi
 Goketsu-bushi
 Shitanoe-bushi
 Jousa-bushi
 Ryūkōka pop music
 Washiya Shiranu
 Meiji Ichidai-jo
 Oden Jigoku no Uta
 Kushimaki Ofuji no Uta (movie song for the "Million Ryo Pot")
 Bakumatsu Ko-uta
 Aosora Dochu（duet with Taro Shoji）
 Shucho no Musume
 17 Shimada

Filmography

The Million Ryo Pot (1935) Nikkatsu dir: Yamanaka Sadao
Tsumagoi Dochu (1937) Nikkatsu dir: Masuda Haruo
Jirokichi Utazange (1937) Shochiku dir: Osone Tatsuo

External links

Japanese film actresses
1903 births
1963 deaths
Actors from Kagoshima Prefecture
Geishas
20th-century Japanese women singers
20th-century Japanese singers